Patricia Hy-Boulais and Mercedes Paz were the defending champions but only Hy competed that year with Ann Grossman.

Grossman and Hy-Boulais lost in the first round to Laura Golarsa and Caroline Vis.

Jill Hetherington and Elna Reinach won in the final 7–6, 6–2 against Golarsa and Vis.

Seeds
Champion seeds are indicated in bold text while text in italics indicates the round in which those seeds were eliminated.

 Laura Golarsa /  Caroline Vis (final)
 Jill Hetherington /  Elna Reinach (champions)
 Ginger Helgeson-Nielsen /  Rachel McQuillan (quarterfinals)
 Alexia Dechaume-Balleret /  Julie Halard (quarterfinals)

Draw

External links
 ITF tournament edition details

WTA Auckland Open
1995 WTA Tour